Pierluigi Frattali (born 1 December 1985) is an Italian footballer who plays as a goalkeeper for  club Bari.

Career
Frattali was signed by Parma as the starting goalkeeper in January 2017. He missed all of March due to injury, with Davide Bassi replacing him as the starting keeper.

On 14 July 2019, he signed a 3-year contract with Bari.

Honours
Bari
 Serie C: 2021–22 (Group C)

References

External links

1985 births
Living people
Footballers from Rome
Italian footballers
Association football goalkeepers
Serie A players
Serie B players
Serie C players
Lega Pro Seconda Divisione players
Serie D players
Frosinone Calcio players
A.S.D. Astrea players
L.R. Vicenza players
Hellas Verona F.C. players
S.C. Vallée d'Aoste players
Cosenza Calcio players
U.S. Avellino 1912 players
Parma Calcio 1913 players
S.S.C. Bari players